Ian Garrison (born April 14, 1998 in Decatur, Georgia) is an American cyclist, who currently rides for UCI Continental team  In October 2020, he was named in the startlist for the 2020 Vuelta a España.

Major results
Source:
2016
 1st Stage 4 Tour de l'Abitibi
 2nd Time trial, National Junior Road Championships
 3rd Overall Trofeo Karlsberg
 3rd  Time trial, UCI Junior World Road Championships
2017
 1st Prologue (TTT) Tour Alsace
 2nd  Time trial, Pan American Under-23 Road Championships
 2nd Kattekoers
 10th Overall Tour de Beauce
2018
 1st Prologue Tour Alsace
 4th Overall Le Triptyque des Monts et Chateaux
2019
 1st  Time trial, National Road Championships
 1st  Time trial, National Under-23 Road Championships
 2nd  Time trial, UCI Road World Under-23 Championships
 2nd Overall Le Triptyque des Monts et Châteaux
 10th Hafjell GP

Grand Tour general classification results timeline

References

External links

1998 births
Living people
American male cyclists
People from Decatur, Georgia